Bob and Mike Bryan were the defending champions, but lost in the quarterfinals to Florin Mergea and Horia Tecău.

Ivan Dodig and Marcelo Melo won the title, defeating Jamie Murray and Bruno Soares in the final, 6–4, 6–4.

Seeds
All seeds received a bye into the second round.

Draw

Finals

Top half

Bottom half

References
Main Draw

Rogers Cup - Men's Doubles
Men's Doubles